Feelings is an album by vibraphonist Milt Jackson accompanied by a string section that was recorded in 1976 and released by the Pablo label.

Reception

AllMusic reviewer Stewart Mason stated "1976's Feelings is an atypical set for Milt Jackson. Usually the epitome of cool jazz hipness, the title track finds the music's pre-eminent vibraphonist squandering his talents on Morris Albert's gloppy pop hit to the accompaniment of an uninspired, violin-heavy string section. Both concept and execution are dire ... The remainder of the album picks up significantly from that abysmal beginning; producer Norman Granz and arranger Jimmy Jones wisely keep the orchestra well in the background, adding the occasional lush, Ellington-like flourish at the beginnings and endings of the tunes but otherwise staying out of the way of Jackson's sublimely melodic vibes ... It's not the average Milt Jackson album, but after a potentially devastating start, Feelings turns out not to be half bad".

Track listing
 "Feelings" (Morris Albert) – 6:22
 "If You Never Come to Me" (Antônio Carlos Jobim, Ray Gilbert) – 4:42
 "Trouble Is a Man" (Alec Wilder) – 5:08
 "Moody Blue" (Gerald Wilson) – 3:21
 "The Day It Rained" (Djalma Ferreira, Ray Gilbert) – 3:41
 "My Kind of Trouble Is You" (Benny Carter, Paul Vandervoort II) – 5:12
 "If You Went Away" (Marcos Valle) – 3:59
 "Tears" (Eumir Deodato) – 3:20
 "Blues For Edith" (Milt Jackson) – 4:50
 "You Don't Know What Love Is" (Gene de Paul, Don Raye) – 5:07

Personnel 
Milt Jackson – vibraphone
Hubert Laws – flute
Jerome Richardson – flute, alto flute
Tommy Flanagan – piano
Dennis Budimir – guitar
Ray Brown – bass
Jimmie Smith – drums
Paulinho da Costa – percussion
Arnold Belnick, Herman Clebanoff, Marcia Van Dyke, Dave Frisina, Jennifer Geller, Al Harshman, Karen Jones, Jacob Krachmalnick, Bernard Kundell, Erno Neufeld, Stanley Plummer, Ralph Schaeffer, Charles Veal, Jerry Vinci – violin
Rollice Dale, David Schwartz – viola
Ronald Cooper, Ray Kramer – cello
Catherine Gotthoffer – harp
Jimmy Jones – arranger, conductor

References 

1976 albums
Milt Jackson albums
Pablo Records albums
Albums produced by Norman Granz